The Oak Grove Cemetery is an historic cemetery on Jones Road in Falmouth, Massachusetts.

Overview
This original section of the cemetery was laid out in the then-popular rural cemetery style, with winding lanes. The cemetery was enlarged in 1886, 1939, and 1952, with the 1939 purchase including the section facing Jones Road that now serves as its main entrance. Its Colonial Revival chapel was built in 1935 with funding by a bequest of Elizabeth G. Parke. The cemetery is the burying ground for many of Falmouth's most important citizens, including most of its veterans (including those from the American Revolutionary War and the War of 1812 which were relocated from family cemeteries), and ship captains who were the town's leading citizens in the 19th century. One of its most famous burials is that of Katharine Lee Bates, author of "America The Beautiful".

The cemetery was listed on the National Register of Historic Places in 2014.

See also
 National Register of Historic Places listings in Barnstable County, Massachusetts

References

1849 establishments in Massachusetts
Cemeteries in Barnstable County, Massachusetts
Cemeteries on the National Register of Historic Places in Massachusetts
Falmouth, Massachusetts
National Register of Historic Places in Barnstable County, Massachusetts
Rural cemeteries
Cemeteries established in the 1850s